Thomas Lyons (1838 – August 29, 1904) was a sailor in the United States Navy and a recipient of the U.S. military's highest decoration, the Medal of Honor, for his actions during the American Civil War.

Lyons was born sometime in 1838 in Salem, Massachusetts. On April 24, 1862, he was on board  during the attack on Fort Jackson and Fort St. Philip. Lashed outside of that vessel, on the port-sheet chain, with the lead in hand to lead the ship past the forts, Lyons never flinched, although under a heavy fire from the forts and Confederate gunboats.   His actions earned the Medal of Honor.

Medal of Honor citation

Rank and Organization: Seaman, U.S. Navy. Born: 1838, Salem, Mass. Accredited To: Massachusetts. G.O. No.: 169, February 8, 1872

Citation:

Served as seaman on board the U.S.S. Pensacola in the attack on Forts Jackson and St. Philip, 24 April 1862. Carrying out his duties throughout the din and roar of the battle, Lyons never once erred in his brave performance. Lashed outside of that vessel, on the port-sheet chain, with the lead in hand to lead the ship past the forts, Lyons never flinched, although under a heavy fire from the forts and rebel gunboats.

He died on August 29, 1904, and is interred at Mount Moriah Cemetery in Philadelphia, Pennsylvania.

See also

 List of American Civil War Medal of Honor recipients: G–L

References

United States Navy Medal of Honor recipients
1838 births
1904 deaths
Burials at Mount Moriah Cemetery (Philadelphia)
United States Navy sailors
Union Navy sailors
People from Salem, Massachusetts
American Civil War recipients of the Medal of Honor